Wan Muhammad Azraie bin Wan Teh (born 7 July 1986) is a Malaysian footballer who plays for Kuching City as a goalkeeper.

Wan Azraie saved an incredible four penalties as Pahang FA returned to the 2013 Malaysia Super League after an absence of one year following a 3-2 sudden-death shootout win over Kedah FA in the promotion-relegation final at the Hang Jebat Stadium in Malacca in July 2012.

Club career

Early career 
Wan Azraie started his career with Pahang in 2011. He performed with the team until 2012. In 2013 he  joined Terengganu for the 2013 season.

Pahang 
Azraie signed with Pahang FA in 2017 season after his departure from Terengganu-based club, T-Team.

Terengganu 
On 8 November 2017, it was confirmed that Wan Azraie has not extend his contract with Pahang and signed with Terengganu.

Career statistics

References

External links 
 

1986 births
Living people
Malaysian footballers
People from Terengganu
Terengganu FC players
Sri Pahang FC players
Sabah F.C. (Malaysia) players
Terengganu F.C. II players
Kuching City F.C. players
Malaysia Premier League players
Malaysia Super League players
Association football goalkeepers
Malaysian people of Malay descent